Jerzy Dabrowski may refer to:

 Jerzy Dąbrowski (1899–1967), a Polish aeronautical engineer
 Jerzy Dąbrowski (lieutenant colonel) (1889–1940), a Polish resistance member
 Jerzy Dabrowski (volleyball), a Polish Paralympic volleyball player and athlete